Lam Tsz-sin (born 1982) is a Hong Kong actor.

Career 
In 2005, Lam began his acting career. Lam has made appearances in one of Stephen Chow's movies. He is best known for playing unconventional characters and comedic characters. Examples of such characters are in Ghetto Justice as a serious lawyer, who is humorous to the audience and in The Mysteries of Love as an annoying, but comedic older brother.

Personal life 
Jazz Lam started dating with his girlfriend Kary on May 20, 2011, registered for marriage on October 16, 2017, and hosted a supplementary wedding banquet at Crowne Plaza Tseung Kwan O on April 3, 2018. In the early morning of December 29, 2019, his wife gave birth to a daughter named Xiao Guaiguai.

Television dramas

Film

References

1982 births
Living people
TVB actors
21st-century Hong Kong male actors
20th-century Hong Kong male actors
Hong Kong male film actors
Hong Kong male television actors